Aleksandr Ilyich Sumin (born 2 June 1995) is a Russian football player.

Club career
He made his professional debut in the Russian Professional Football League for FC Chertanovo Moscow on 16 August 2014 in a game against FC Dynamo Bryansk.

Sumin made a single appearances for Russian National Football League side FC Sibir Novosibirsk during the 2018–19 Russian Cup.

References

External links
 Career summary by sportbox.ru

1995 births
Footballers from Moscow
Living people
Russian footballers
Association football defenders
FC Sibir Novosibirsk players
FC Chertanovo Moscow players